A blooper is a mistake made on television or in film.

Blooper or bloopers may also refer to:

Arts, entertainment, and media
 Blooper (band), an American indie rock band
 Blooper (Mario), an enemy in the Mario franchise
 (Blooper) Bunny, an eight-minute cartoon released in 1991 by Warner Bros.
 Bloopers (TV series), 2012

Sports
 Blooper, the mascot for the Atlanta Braves
 Blooper, a type of baseball hit, see Glossary of baseball (B)

Other uses
 Blooper (sail), type of headsail which, according to competitive sailing rules, counts as a jib and not a spinnaker
 Blooper is the nickname of the M79 Grenade launcher, a weapon used extensively by American infantry forces during the Vietnam War

See also 
 Bloop (disambiguation)
 Bloop, ultra-low frequency and extremely powerful underwater sound
 The Phantom Blooper: A Novel of Vietnam, a novel by Gustav Hasford